Hong Kong League Cup 2002–03 is the 3rd staging of the Hong Kong League Cup.

Sun Hei got their first champion in this competition by winning an aggregate 6-4 against Happy Valley in the final. The team got HK$50,000 as championship prize.

Group stage
All times are Hong Kong Time (UTC+8).

Group A

Group B

Knockout stage

Bracket

Semi-finals

Final

Trivia
 Lai Kai Cheuk and Cheng Siu Chung Ricky of Happy Valley were the only players who missed in the penalty shootout of the final. Chan Ka Ki of Sun Hei saved both shots.

References
 www.rsssf.com Hongkong 2002/03
 HKFA website 聯賽盃回顧(三) (in chinese)

Hong Kong League Cup
League Cup
Hong Kong League Cup